The 2016–17 season was 16th season in the top Ukrainian football league for Volyn Lutsk. Volyn competed in Premier League and in the Ukrainian Cup. On May 12, 2017 Football Federation of Ukraine deducted six points from Volyn in order to implement the decision of FIFA Disciplinary Committee of 15 March 2017.  The club was penalized for failing to clear their debts with former player Saša Stević. As a result club lost all chances to stay in Premier League three matchdays ahead of season finish and was relegated to Ukrainian First League.

Players

Squad information

Transfers

In

Out

Pre-season and friendlies

Competitions

Overall

Last updated:

Premier League

League table

Results summary

Results by round

Matches

Notes:
 Match was not finished due to the fans behavior after fire landed near the referee.

Ukrainian Cup

Statistics

Appearances and goals

|-
! colspan=14 style=background:#dcdcdc; text-align:center| Goalkeepers

|-
! colspan=14 style=background:#dcdcdc; text-align:center| Defenders

|-
! colspan=14 style=background:#dcdcdc; text-align:center| Midfielders 

|-
! colspan=14 style=background:#dcdcdc; text-align:center| Forwards

|-
! colspan=14 style=background:#dcdcdc; text-align:center| Players transferred out during the season

|-

Last updated: 31 May 2017

Goalscorers

Last updated: 16 April 2017

Clean sheets

Last updated: 3 December 2016

Disciplinary record

Last updated: 27 May 2017

References

External links 
 Official website

Volyn
FC Volyn Lutsk seasons